Jack Bentley may refer to:

Jack Bentley (footballer) (1942–2007), English footballer
Jack Bentley (baseball) (1895–1969), American baseball player
Jack Bentley (musician) (1913–1994), English trombonist and journalist

See also
John Bentley (disambiguation)